Furneaux is a Norman-French locational surname.

Notable people with this name include:
Charles Furneaux (1835–1913), drawing instructor in the Boston area
Furneaux Cook (1839–1903), English opera singer and actor
Henry Furneaux (1829–1900), British classical scholar, specialising in Tacitus
Karen Furneaux (born 1976), Canadian sprint kayaker who has been competing since 1988
Ky Furneaux (born 1973), Australian outdoor guide, TV host, female survival expert and stunt person
Peter Furneaux (1935-2014), English football club chairman and investor
Philip Furneaux (1726–1783), English independent minister
Robert Furneaux Jordan (1905–1978), English architect, architectural critic and novelist
Robin Furneaux or Frederick Smith (1936–1985), 3rd Earl of Birkenhead
Thomas Furneaux Lennon or Thomas Lennon (filmmaker), documentary filmmaker
Tobias Furneaux (1735–1781), English navigator and Royal Navy officer, accompanied James Cook on his second voyage of exploration
William Mordaunt Furneaux or William Furneaux, Dean of Winchester in the early decades of the 20th century
Yvonne Furneaux (born 1928), French film actress

References